Estefanía Gómez (born Carmenza Estefanía Gómez Osorio on November 19, 1976 in Ibagué, Tolima, Colombia), also known as Estefanía Gómez, is a Colombian actress.

She is best known as Aura María Fuentes in Yo soy Betty, la fea.

Filmography

Telenovelas 
 2019 - El Final de Paraíso 
 2016 - Sin senos sí hay paraíso.... Vanessa Salazar
 2010 - El Clon ....Vicky
 2009 - Victorinos .... Madre de victorino perez
 2003 - Amor a la plancha ....Candela Guerrero
 1999 - Yo soy Betty, la fea .... Aura María Fuentes

TV Series 

 2009 - El Capo ....Luz Dary
 2005 - Padres e hijos
 2001 - Ecomoda ....Aura María Fuentes

References

 

Colombian telenovela actresses
Colombian television actresses
1976 births
Living people
21st-century Colombian actresses